Van Valkenburgh or Van Valkenburg is a Dutch toponymic surname indicating an origin in Valkenburg, Dutch Limburg. Notable people with the surname include:

Arba Seymour Van Valkenburgh (1862–1944), American judge
Blaire Van Valkenburgh (born 1952), American paleontologist
Deborah Van Valkenburgh (born 1952), American actress
Dennis van Valkenburgh (born 1944), American sprint canoer
Elizabeth Van Valkenburgh (1799–1846), American murderer
Franklin Van Valkenburgh (1888–1941), American naval officer
Lois Van Valkenburgh (1920–2002), American lobbyist, legislative aide, and activist
Michael Van Valkenburgh (born 1951), American landscape architect
Paul Van Valkenburgh, American sportswriter
Robert Bruce Van Valkenburgh (1821–1888), American politician and Union Army officer
 Alvin Van Valkenburg (1913–1991), American physicist and inventor
 Mac Van Valkenburg (1921–1997), American engineer and academic
 Pete Van Valkenburg (born 1950), American football player

See also
Valkenburg (surname)
USS Van Valkenburgh (DD-656), Fletcher-class destroyer of the United States Navy
Van Valkenburgh-Isbister Farm, historic house in Columbia County, New York, United States
James G. Van Valkenburgh House, historic house in Columbia County, New York, United States

Dutch-language surnames
Surnames of Dutch origin
Toponymic surnames